Einer Peter Lund (25 Nov 1903-2 May 1974)  was elected to the Wisconsin State Assembly in 1958. He was born at Sundsvall Municipality in Västernorrland County, Sweden. He attended Carroll University in Waukesha, Wisconsin. He served one term in the Wisconsin State Legislature and later owned and operated Lund's Clothing Store in Menomonie, Wisconsin.

References

Swedish emigrants to the United States
1903 births
1974 deaths
Carroll University alumni
People from Dunn County, Wisconsin
20th-century American politicians
Democratic Party members of the Wisconsin State Assembly